Aeromicrobium choanae is a Gram-positive and non-spore-forming bacterium from the genus Aeromicrobium which has been isolated from the bird Sylvia borin.

References

External links
Type strain of Aeromicrobium choanae at BacDive -  the Bacterial Diversity Metadatabase

Propionibacteriales
Bacteria described in 2017